Edward James Kallina (October 27, 1901 – May 15, 1963) was a minor league baseball player and American football offensive lineman. He played baseball from 1925 to 1930 and football in 1928.

Early life and education
Ed Kallina was born on October 27, 1901 in Nada, Texas. He went to college at Sam Houston St. and at Texas St.

Baseball career

Bloomington Bloomers
He started his baseball career as a minor league player for the Bloomington Bloomers. They were in the Illinois-Indiana-Iowa League. He played with them from 1925 to 1927. In 1925 he played in 31 games and had 79 plate appearances. As a pitcher he had a 3-7 record. In 1926 he played in 56 games and had 144 plate appearances. He had a 7-14 record when he was a pitcher. In 1927 he played for two teams. With the Bloomers he pitched a 3-3 record.

Des Moines Demons
For part of 1927, he played for the Des Moines Demons. He played in 25 games for them. When pitching he had a 2-3 record.

Tulsa Oilers
In 1928, he played for the Tulsa Oilers. He played in 13 games for them. He had 29 plate appearances.

Abilene Aces
He also played for the Abilene Aces in 1928. No statistics were recorded for when he played with them.

Sherman Snappers
In 1929 he played for the Sherman Snappers. He played in 17 games for them.

Midland Colts
He also played with the Midland Colts in 1929. He played in 94 games with them. He had 44 Home Runs Hit/Allowed in 1929.

Joplin Miners
His final season was in 1930 with the Joplin Miners. He played in 118 games with them.

Football career

Chicago Bears
In 1928 he played one season for the Chicago Bears of the NFL. He  played in 4 games as an offensive lineman for them.

Later life
He died on May 15, 1963 in Houston, Texas.

References

External links
 Edward James Kallina (1901-1963) - Find A Grave...

1901 births
1963 deaths
Baseball pitchers
Bloomington Bloomers players
Des Moines Demons players
Tulsa Oilers (baseball) players
Chicago Bears players
Midland Colts players
Joplin Miners players